Benjamin Anthony Lanzarone (born October 28, 1938) is an American composer. He was the winner of ASCAP's Most Performed Composer Award.

See also Bhen Lanzaroni

Filmography

Composer
 "The Love Boat" (1979-1986)
 "Dynasty" (1982-1985)
 "Happy Days" (1978- 1980)
"The Colbys" (1985-1987)
"Hotel" (1983-1985)
"Mork and Mindy" (1978)
"Mr. Belvedere"
"Laverne and Shirley"
"Aloha Paradise"
"Tracy Ullman Show"
"Vegas"
"Matt Houston"
"Shirley"
"Out of the Blue"
"Good Time Girls"
"Glitter"

Personal life 

Lanzarone married actress Ilene Graff. Married since 1977, the couple has a daughter, Nikka Graff Lanzarone.

References

External links

Photos Of Ben Lanzarone
Interview with Ben Lanzarone
Ben Lanzarone in 2013

1938 births
Living people
21st-century American composers